Amina Cain is an American writer, best known for her 2020 novel Indelicacy.


Writing
Cain began writing in her last year as an undergraduate. Cain lived in Chicago during the mid-2000s and later moved to Los Angeles, where she continues to live as of 2020.

Writers who have influenced Cain's work include Lydia Davis. Other writers Cain has expressed an "affinity toward" include Marguerite Duras, Renee Gladman, Azareen Van der Vliet Oloomi, and Kate Zambreno.

Honors
Indelicacy was shortlisted for the 2020 Center for Fiction First Novel Prize and for the 2021 Folio Prize.

Bibliography

Nonfiction
 A Horse At Night: On Writing (2022)

Novels
 Indelicacy (2020)

Short story collections
 Creature (2013)
 ''I Go To Some Hollow (2009)

References

Living people
American women novelists
Year of birth missing (living people)
21st-century American women writers
21st-century American novelists